Millettia hitsika is a species of plant in the family Fabaceae. It is endemic to Madagascar.

References

hitsika
Endemic flora of Madagascar
Endangered plants
Taxonomy articles created by Polbot